Elián González Brotons (born December 6, 1993) is a Cuban industrial engineer and politician who, as a child, became embroiled in an international custody and immigration controversy in 2000 involving the governments of Cuba and the United States, his father Juan Miguel González Quintana, his other relatives in Cuba and in Miami, and Miami's Cuban community. In 2023, he was nominated for a seat in the National Assembly of People's Power.

González's mother Elizabeth Brotons Rodríguez drowned in November 1999 while attempting to leave Cuba with González and her boyfriend to get to the United States. Elián Gonzalez was five years old when found nestled in an inner tube floating at sea  from Florida's Fort Lauderdale coast. Two fishermen found Elián and reluctantly handed him over to the U.S. Coast Guard, as they feared he would be sent back to Cuba under the wet feet, dry feet policy since he had not yet reached land. The Coast Guard assured them that Elián would be taken "ashore for medical reasons," deeming him eligible to stay. Elián was immediately taken to a hospital and treated for dehydration and minor cuts on his body. It was later found that Elián's mother, Elisabeth Brotons Rodríguez, and Lázaro Munero García, her common-law husband, had escaped Cárdenas, Cuba, as part of a group with 14 refugees on a  boat. However, the others died in a storm, while a young couple escaped to the shore, and Elián was found.

Once he had been treated, the Immigration and Naturalization Service (INS) provided Elián with a temporary deferral regarding his inspection, and further released Elián to his great-uncle, Lázaro González, who lived with his family in Miami's Little Havana. These relatives informed the family in Cárdenas to prepare for an extreme hardship visa waiver. The former were told the next day that "some functionary of the government would be coming to get the boy" as a result of Fidel Castro's having met with Juan Miguel, Elián's father. The involvement of the Cuban Communist leader in the case and the subsequent diplomatic note written to the U.S. Department of State emphasizing the father's demand for Elián's repatriation attracted international attention. This is because Elián had become a "symbol to many exiles" reminding them of the solidarity of the Cuban exile community and its privileged status with economic refugee criteria. While Elián escaped both Cuba and death, he soon entered custody battles waged by his father, Miami relatives, and state officials from the U.S. and Cuba.

On January 10, 2000, a Florida state court had ruled that the Florida family court was able to decide the merit of motion related with temporary custody by Lázaro González, stating that Elián should stay with the Miami relatives until a further custody hearing. However, Attorney General Janet Reno declared that the federal courts are responsible for deciding this case, and that the Miami relatives must appeal to the federal court. Here, the objective of Reno was to provide the relatives with a chance to provide "any information" they could that would be "relevant in the decision". She again emphasized that the INS commissioner had declared that the father speaks for the son, and that his wishes were to have his son returned to him.

Early life
Elián González was born December 6, 1993, to divorced parents.

Journey to Florida

On November 21, 1999, González, his mother Elizabeth Brotons Rodríguez, and twelve others left Cuba on a small aluminum boat with a faulty engine; González's mother and ten others died in the crossing. González and the other two survivors floated at sea until they were rescued by two fishermen, who handed them over to the U.S. Coast Guard.

González's cousin Marisleysis said that the boat's motor broke down and they tried in vain to bail out the water with nylon bags, but a storm doomed their efforts. He told her he tried to help get the water out and his mother's boyfriend placed him in an inner tube for safety. "He said afterwards that he fell asleep and that when he woke up he never saw his mother again". He said, "I think she drowned too because she didn't know how to swim".

Nivaldo Fernández Ferrán, one of the three survivors on the boat, said "Elizabeth protected her son to the end". According to Fernández Ferrán, they set out on their trip at 4 am, dragging inflated rubber floats, or inner tubes, in case they needed them. As they encountered bad weather, the boat's engine failed and the craft began to fill with water. After it went under, the passengers clung to the inner tubes in cold water, with waves reaching heights of three to four meters (10 to 13 feet).

Afterwards, the Immigration and Naturalization Service (INS) released González to his paternal great-uncle, Lázaro. According to The Washington Post, González's father, Juan Miguel González Quintana, had telephoned Lázaro from Cuba on November 22, 1999, to advise that González and his mother had left Cuba without Juan Miguel's knowledge, and to watch for their arrival.

Custody dispute in the United States

The U.S. legislation system had enacted the Cuban Adjustment Act in 1966, which sought to provide political asylum for Cubans who fled their country in the hopes of a new life. Under the act, Cuban refugees without visas entering the United States were paroled, and after a year could apply for permanent resident status. The US also issued 20,000 lottery visas every year to Cuban emigrants under the wet foot, dry foot policy. Under this policy, those who reached the mainland were granted asylum, while those who were intercepted at sea by the U.S. Coast Guard were sent back to Cuba.   

Lázaro González, backed by local Cuban Americans, took the position that the boy should remain in the United States and not be returned to his father. Marisleysis González (Lázaro's adult daughter) became Elián González's caretaker and spokesperson for the paternal relatives. Also, Armando Gutierrez, a local Cuban-American businessman, became a spokesman. At the same time, Juan Miguel, with the support of Cuban authorities, demanded that his son be returned to Cuba.

On January 21, 2000, Elián González's grandmothers, Mariela Quintana and Raquel Rodríguez, flew from Havana to the United States to seek their grandson's return to Cuba. While they were able to meet with the boy only once at the Miami Beach home of Barry University president Sister Jeanne O'Laughlin, they journeyed to Washington and met with congressmen and Attorney General Janet Reno. After nine days of media coverage (during which Republican lawmakers acknowledged they did not have the votes to pass a bill to give González U.S. citizenship), they returned to Cuba to "a hero's welcome".

On January 28, the Spanish foreign minister Abel Matutes called for the boy's return to Cuba, stating that international law dictated the return. Meanwhile, the Miami Gonzálezes denied allegations that they had offered Juan Miguel a house and a car if he abandoned the action and joined his son in Miami. Juan Miguel was uninterested in emigrating.

Through January and February, Juan Miguel sent a number of open letters to the U.S. government—published in, among other places, the Cuban newspaper Granma—demanding the return of his son and refusing the Miami relatives' demands.

Chicago-based fathers' rights attorney Jeffery M. Leving spearheaded the amicus brief, which set the foundation of the custody case to reunite González with his father in Cuba. Manuel González, Elián Gonzalez's great uncle, later retained Leving to reunite González with his father.

On March 21, Judge Kevin Michael Moore of the United States District Court for the Southern District of Florida dismissed the relatives' petition for asylum which they had filed on behalf of Elián González. Lázaro vowed to appeal. On March 29, Miami-Dade County mayor Alex Penelas was joined by 22 other civic leaders in a speech in downtown Miami. Penelas indicated that the municipality would not cooperate with Federal authorities on any repatriation of the boy, and would not lend police assets or any other assistance in taking the boy.

On April 14, a video was released in which Elián González tells Juan Miguel that he wants to stay in the United States. However, many thought that he had been coached, as a male voice was heard off-camera directing the young boy. In a September 2005 interview with 60 Minutes after being sent back to Cuba, González stated that during his stay in the U.S., his family members were "telling me bad things about [my father]", and "were also telling me to tell him that I did not want to go back to Cuba, and I always told them I wanted to."

Elián González remained a subject of media attention as he went to Walt Disney World Resort one day, then met with politicians the next. Throughout the custody battle, opinion polls showed that a majority of Americans believed González should be returned to his father in Cuba, and that doing so was in the boy's best interest.

Attorney General Janet Reno ordered the return of Elián González to his father and set a deadline of April 13, 2000, but the Miami relatives defied the order. Negotiations continued for several days as the house was surrounded by protesters as well as police. The relatives insisted on guarantees that they could live with the child for several months and retain custody, and that González would not be returned to Cuba. Negotiations carried on throughout the night, but Reno claimed that the relatives rejected all workable solutions.

On April 19, the 11th Circuit Court of Appeals in Atlanta ruled that González must remain in the U.S. until the Miami Gonzálezes could appeal for an asylum hearing in May.

A Florida family court judge revoked Lázaro's temporary custody, clearing the way for González to be returned to his father's custody. On April 20, Reno made the decision to remove González from the house and instructed law enforcement officials to determine the best time to obtain the boy. After being informed of the decision, Marisleysis said to a Justice Department community relations officer, "You think we just have cameras in the house? If people try to come in, they could be hurt."

Seizure and reactions

In the pre-dawn hours of Saturday, April 22, agents of the Border Patrol's special BORTAC unit, as part of an operation in which more than 130 INS personnel took part, approached the house, knocked on the door, and identified themselves. When no one responded, they entered. At the same time, pepper-spray and mace were employed against persons outside who attempted to interfere. In the confusion, Armando Gutierrez called in Alan Diaz, of the Associated Press, to enter the house and enter a room with González, his great uncle's wife Angela Lázaro, her niece, the niece's young son, and Donato Dalrymple (one of the two men who had rescued him from the ocean). They waited in the room listening to agents searching the house. Diaz took a widely publicized photograph of a border patrol agent confronting Dalrymple and the boy.

INS also stated in the days after the raid that they had identified as many as two dozen persons who were "prepared to thwart any government operation", some of whom had concealed weapons while others had criminal records.

Approximately 100 people protested against the raid as it took place, with some calling the INS agents "assassins". Then-New York City Mayor Rudy Giuliani described Border Patrol BORTAC agents involved in the seizure of Elian as "storm troopers" at least six times. Federal Law Enforcement Officers Association reacted with "strong disgust and dismay" to the Nazi imagery and demanded Giuliani's apology. Hillary Clinton, then running against Giuliani for a Senate seat, agreed with FLEOA in asking for an apology. He refused to apologize, though stated his criticism was aimed at Bill Clinton and AG Janet Reno. Giuliani withdrew from the race for unrelated reasons.

Public opinion about the INS raid on the Miami González's house was widely polarized. There were two major focuses in media coverage of the event: the raid and the family reunions. A Time magazine issue showed a photo of a joyful González being reunited with his father (the caption says "Papa!"), while Newsweek ran an issue that focused on the raid, entitled "Seizing Elián".

Return to father's custody
Four hours after he was taken from the house in Miami, González and his father were reunited at Andrews Air Force Base. The next day, the White House released a photograph showing a smiling González reunited with his father, which the Miami relatives disputed by claiming that it was a fake González in the photograph. Later, González and his family were taken to the Aspen Institute Wye River Conference Center in Maryland (formerly known as "Wye Plantation"). The media were barred from access to the family.

While the family was still at Andrews, New Hampshire senator Bob Smith, escorting the Miami González relatives, was turned away from the base by guards. The May 5, 2000, Miami Herald reported that González was joined by his classmates (without their parents) and his teacher from his hometown, Cárdenas. The newspaper Granma released pictures of Elián in the Young Pioneer uniform of Cuba's Communist youth league. On May 6, 2000, attorney Greg Craig took González and Juan Miguel to a dinner in the Georgetown neighborhood of Washington, DC, hosted by Smith and Elizabeth Bagley.

After González was returned to his father's custody, he remained in the U.S. while the Miami relatives exhausted their legal options. A three-judge federal panel had ruled that he could not go back to Cuba until he was granted an asylum hearing, but the case turned on the right of the relatives to request that hearing on behalf of the boy. On June 1, 2000, the 11th U.S. Circuit Court of Appeals ruled that Elián was too young to file for asylum; only his father could speak for him, and the relatives lacked legal standing. On June 28, 2000, the U.S. Supreme Court declined to review the decision. In the afternoon of the same day, seven months and one week after Elián González left Cuba, he and his family, along with his classmates and teacher, boarded two chartered planes at Dulles International Airport in Dulles, Virginia, for José Martí International Airport in Havana.

Political ramifications
Commentators have suggested that the Elián González affair may have been a factor in voters' decisions in the 2000 United States presidential election, which could have affected the close outcome in Florida. Al Gore's handling of the matter may have angered the predominantly Republican Cuban community over the boy's return to Cuba. Gore initially supported Republican legislation to give the boy and his father permanent residence status, but later supported the administration position. He was attacked by both sides in the dispute for his equivocal position.

Life in Cuba

Youth and schooling 
After his return to Cuba, Elián González lived with his father, stepmother, and three brothers in Cárdenas, where his father, Juan Miguel, was a waiter at an Italian restaurant at Josone Park, in Varadero, near Cárdenas. Elián's father was interviewed at the restaurant in 2004 by Keith Morrison of the NBC News program Dateline NBC and Cover to Cover on CNBC. Juan Miguel filmed a home video on which González was shown doing his arithmetic homework with Juan Miguel in their dining room, going to bed in his bedroom with his two younger half-brothers, and attending karate lessons.

Morrison's TV report also showed an 18th-century building in Cárdenas which was previously used as a fire station and which was renovated and inaugurated on July 14, 2001, as a museum, called Museo de la Batalla de Ideas ("Museum of the Battle of Ideas"), which includes an exhibition room dedicated to González, which houses a life-size bronze statue of González raising a clenched fist. The former González home in Miami has similarly been turned into a museum, with the boy's bedroom left unaltered. Juan Miguel is also a member of the National Assembly and has attended events for the Communist Party of Cuba with González, who has been called up to the stage to meet Fidel Castro.

In September 2005, González was interviewed by 60 Minutes and stated during the interview that Fidel Castro was a friend, and that he considers Castro "not only as a friend but as a father"; González's aunt, Angela González, said she doubted whether the interview represented his true beliefs because of the alleged controls imposed by Cuba on information. In December 2006, an ill Fidel Castro was unable to attend González's 13th birthday celebration, so his brother Raúl attended instead.

On August 16, 2006, the United States Court of Appeals for the Eleventh Circuit affirmed the dismissal of an excessive force lawsuit brought by Dalrymple and others against the federal government and Reno.

González joined the Young Communist Union of Cuba in June 2008 shortly after graduating from junior high school. At age 15, he began military school. In a November 2013 speech, González described his time in the United States as "very sad times for me, which marked me for my whole life", asserting that the Cuban Adjustment Act led to the denial of his rights, including "the right to be together with my father, the right to keep my nationality and to remain in my cultural context".

College and career 
In 2015, González was studying to be an industrial engineer, and hoped to marry his high school girlfriend and fiancée after finishing college. He stated that although he did not regret returning to Cuba, he would like to travel to the United States one day "to give my love to the American people". In July 2016, he received a degree in industrial engineering from the University of Matanzas, and read a letter to Fidel Castro from his graduating class, vowing "to fight from whatever trench the revolution demands".

After graduating in 2016, González began working as a technology specialist at a state-run company that makes large plastic water tanks. On Father's Day in 2020, González announced that he and his fiancée were expecting a daughter within the following months. González was nominated to run in the 2023 Cuban parliamentary election, seeking election to represent Cárdenas.

Depictions in popular culture
The struggle between González's American family and his father was portrayed in the 2000 television film, A Family In Crisis: The Elian Gonzales Story, which starred Esai Morales as Elián's father, Juan Miguel Gonzalez; Laura Harring as Elián's cousin Marisleysis Gonzalez; and Alec Roberts in the title role.

Elián is a 2017 documentary film directed by Ross McDonnell and Tim Golden, produced by Trevor Birney and executive produced by Alex Gibney. The film details González's story with exclusive interviews with him and his family in both Cuba and Miami. The film was co-produced by Fine Point Films and Jigsaw Productions and has a voiceover by Raul Esparza. The film premiered on April 19, 2017, at the Tribeca Film Festival. It opened in limited release in May, and appeared on CNN Films in August 2017.

González was featured in the HBO documentary 537 Votes.

The 2000 conflict centered upon González was parodied in the South Park episode "Quintuplets 2000".

The story was parodied in the first sketch of the Freddie Prinze, Jr. hosted episode of Saturday Night Live, as a part of its 25th season in 2000. Elian was played by Chris Kattan, while his aunt and uncle were portrayed by Ana Gasteyer and Horatio Sanz, respectively.

A song titled "Baby Elian" was released by the Manic Street Preachers in 2001 along with their album Know Your Enemy. The song was famously played at the Karl Marx Theatre in Cuba, with Cuban leader Fidel Castro rising to applaud the song.

Elian is referenced in the third volume of the popular parody DJ mix "CVS Bangers" by DJ Hennessey Youngman. He exclaims in the introduction, "Banging down the doors of Valhalla looking for Elian González", and later "Where you at Elian".

See also

 Cuban exile
 Cuba–United States relations
 Operation Peter Pan (1960–1962)
 Parental rights
 Yossele Schumacher affair, a similar occurrence
 Polovchak v. Meese, an earlier child asylum case (1980–1985), viewed by some as a precedent

Footnotes

Further reading
 Allatson, Paul, and Molina Guzman, Isabel. "The Elián González Discursive Template: Mediating Children in Multiple Spheres of Conflict”, Journal of Children and Media 2.3 (September 2008): 248–63.
 de la Cova, Antonio Rafael. "The Elian Gonzalez Case: The World's Most Watched and Politically-Charged Custody Battle that Reached the U.S. Supreme Court and Determined a Presidential Election", Harvard Latino Law Review, Vol. 18, Spring 2015, pp. 501–49.
De La Torre, Miguel A., "La Lucha for Cuba: Religion and Politics on the Streets of Miami", University of California Press, 2003.

External links
 A Brief History of the Elian Gonzalez Affair – slideshow by Time magazine
  Official Cuban website : about the custody battle for Elián
 
 
 
 
 BORTAC: defusing the hot spots, CBP Today – May 2004 article on U.S. Border Patrol BORTAC Program
 Elián González and the Cuban Crisis: 10 years later article by The Guardian
 Elián: What Have We Learned?
 Elián, thanks to Fidel Castro

1993 births
Living people
2000 in the United States
2000 in international relations
2000 in Cuba
2000 in Florida
Cuban engineers
Cuban expatriates in the United States
Cuba–United States relations
History of Florida
People from Cárdenas, Cuba
Right of asylum in the United States
Trials regarding custody of children
United States election controversies
Presidency of Bill Clinton
Clinton administration controversies
Controversies in Florida
2000 controversies